Lee County Courthouse may refer to:

 Lee County Courthouse (Alabama), Opelika, Alabama
 Lee County Courthouse (Arkansas), Marianna, Arkansas
 Old Lee County Courthouse, Fort Myers, Florida
 Lee County Courthouse (Georgia), Leesburg, Georgia
 Lee County Courthouse (Illinois), Dixon, Illinois
 Lee County Courthouse (Fort Madison, Iowa)
 Lee County Courthouse (Keokuk, Iowa)
 Lee County Courthouse (Mississippi), Tupelo, Mississippi, listed on the National Register of Historic Places
 Lee County Courthouse (North Carolina), Sanford, North Carolina
 Lee County Courthouse (South Carolina), Bishopville, South Carolina
 Lee County Courthouse (Texas), Giddings, Texas

See also
 Lea County Courthouse